Bahamian may refer to anything of or from The Bahamas, an island country located in the Atlantic Ocean northeast of Cuba.

 Bahamians, citizens of the Bahamas and descendants of the Bahamian diaspora
 Bahamian English, a dialect of English spoken in The Bahamas and by Bahamian diasporas
 Culture of the Bahamas, a hybrid of African, European, and other cultures
 Demographics of the Bahamas, population, ethnicity, and other aspects of the population of The Bahamas

See also 
 Bahamian American, Americans of Bahamian ancestry
 List of Bahamians, notable people from the Bahamas or of Bahamian descent
 
 

Language and nationality disambiguation pages